Jean-Michel Monin (born 7 September 1967 in Argenteuil) is a French cyclist. He won the Gold Medal in  Men's team pursuit in the 1996 Summer Olympics.

References 

Cyclists at the 1996 Summer Olympics
Olympic cyclists of France
Olympic gold medalists for France
French male cyclists
Olympic medalists in cycling
1967 births
Living people
Sportspeople from Argenteuil
Medalists at the 1996 Summer Olympics
French track cyclists
Cyclists from Île-de-France